The Public Service Commission (PSC) has a constitutional role to appoint, confirm, promote, transfer, dismiss and exercise disciplinary control over public officers in Singapore. It is constituted under Part IX of the Constitution of Singapore.

The PSC also retains two key non-constitutional roles. It considers the suitability of candidates for appointment as chief executive officers of statutory boards; it is also responsible for the planning and administration of scholarships provided by the Government of Singapore. Members are appointed by the president, in consultation with the prime minister.

Appointments

List of chairmen

See also
 Organisation of the Government of Singapore
 Statutory boards of the Government of Singapore
 Singapore Civil Service
 President's Scholar
 The SAF Scholarship

References

External links
Official website of the Public Service Commission, Singapore

 
Singapore